Aleks Vlah (born 22 July 1997) is a Slovenian handballer who plays for RK Celje and the Slovenia national team.

Vlah represented Slovenia at the 2023 World Men's Handball Championship, where he was the team's top scorer with 31 goals in 6 matches.

In February 2023, he signed a three-year contract with Aalborg Håndbold in Denmark.

References

1997 births
Living people
People from Izola
Slovenian male handball players
Expatriate handball players
RK Zagreb players
Slovenian expatriate sportspeople in Croatia